HMS Lily was an  composite gunvessel built for the Royal Navy. She was launched in 1874, saw service in Chinese and North American waters, and was wrecked on the coast of Labrador on 16 September 1888.

Design and construction
Designed by Nathaniel Barnaby, the Royal Navy's Chief Constructor, Lily was ordered from the Govan yard of Robert Napier and Sons in 1873 and laid down the same year as yard number 334. She was launched on 27 October 1874 and commissioned at Devonport in August 1875.

Her hull was built of iron frames and ribs, and planked in wood. This "composite" construction was both cheap and easy to repair and allowed the wooden planking to be coppered, reducing marine growth. On far-flung colonial stations, the benefits of both simple repair and reduced marine growth were particularly positive, due to a lack of substantial ship repair and careening facilities. For this reason, smaller vessels like the Arab class continued to use composite construction until long after larger vessels had transitioned to iron or steel construction.

Propulsion
A single screw was provided, which could be hoisted clear of the water to improve the ship's hull lines when sailing. She achieved a trials speed of  under power. A sailing rig was provided, with square rig on the fore and main masts, and fore-and-aft rigging only on the mizzen, giving her a "barque" rig.

Armament
A single 7-inch rifled muzzle-loading gun amidships and 2 6.3-inch 64-pounder rifled muzzle-loading guns, one forward and one aft, and both fitted on traversing slides, constituted her main armament. Two machine guns and a light gun were also fitted.

Service
Lily served on the China station and was recommissioned at Hong Kong in 1879. By April 1886 she was serving on the North America and West Indies station.

Fate
Lily was wrecked off Point Amour Lighthouse, Labrador in thick fog on 16 September 1888. A capsized boat caused the death of seven of her ship's company.

Footnotes

Bibliography

 

 

Ships built in Govan
Arab-class gunvessels
1874 ships
Maritime incidents in September 1889
Shipwrecks of the Newfoundland and Labrador coast
Shipwrecks in the Atlantic Ocean